The Premier League Goal of the Month is an association football award that recognises the player who is deemed to have scored the best Premier League goal each month of the season from August to April. The winner is chosen by a combination of an online public vote, which contributes to 10% of the final tally, and a panel of experts.

At the end of the season, the nine monthly winners are put forward for the Premier League Goal of the Season, which is chosen using the same method, although the 2016–17 award featured, and indeed was won by, a goal from May which did not go to a vote.

The award was introduced for the 2016–17 season and is currently known by its sponsored name, the Budweiser Goal of the Month.

, Fulham player Willian is the latest winner of the Goal of the Month award.

Winners

Awards won by player

Awards won by club

Awards won by nationality

See also 
 BBC Goal of the Month
 Premier League Goal of the Season

References

Goal of the Month
Goal of the Month
Association football player non-biographical articles
Association football goal of the month awards